Tahsan Rahman Khan (Bengali:তাহসান রহমান খান; born 18 October 1979), known mononymously as Tahsan, is a Bangladeshi musician and actor. He is the lead singer of his own rock band Tahsan and the Band.

Born and raised in Dhaka, Tahsan first started his musical career with the alternative rock band Black. He later left the band and started his solo music career, his first solo album is Kothopokothon released in the year 2004. He also started his television acting career in 2004 with the famous drama “Offbeat” and has subsequently performed in more than 100 dramas in television and OTT platform combined. Tahsan has been appointed as the Goodwill Ambassador of UNHCR in January 2021. In addition to the music and acting career, Tahsan is also a university teacher. He started his teaching career from 2006 and taught in few different universities of Dhaka. He was the Senior Lecturer of BRAC University.

His song "Alo Alo" from the album Icche is one of the most popular songs in the country.

Early life and education
He learned singing at Shishu Academy and Chhayanaut. He attended A. G. Church School, St. Joseph High School (Dhaka) and Notre Dame College, Dhaka. He obtained a BBA in marketing and an MBA in finance from the Institute of Business Administration, University of Dhaka. He completed a second MBA at the University of Minnesota on a Fulbright scholarship.

Personal life 
Tahsan Khan met Rafiath Rashid Mithila in 2004 when they were students at the University of Dhaka. They married in 2006. The couple announced their divorce in 2017. Their daughter, Ayra Tehrim Khan, was four years old at the time.

Discography
Black

 Amar Prithibi (2002)
 Utsober Por (2003)
 Anushilon (2001)

Tahsan and the Band

 Shobar Jonne Na (2020)

Studio albums

 Kothopokothon (2004)
 Kritodasher Nirban (25 December 2005)
 Ichche (25 December 2006)
 Nei (2008)
 Prottaborton (February 2011)
 Uddessho Nei (22 July 2014)
 Oviman Amar (October 2017)

Movie songs

 Chuye Dile Mon  - Movie : Chuye Dile Mon (2015) ft. Tahsan & Kona
 Ami Parbona Tomar Hote - Movie : Jodi Ekdin (2019) ft. Tahsan &  Konal

Featured albums

 Tahsan ft. Minar (Danpite) (2008)
 Tahsan ft. Sakib Jakir (Self titled) (2009)
 Tahsan ft. Minar (Aari) (2011)

Singles

 Lighthouse
 Kothay Acho – Telefilm: Amader Golpo (2012)
 Megher Pore – Telefilm: Monforinger Golpo (2012)
 Prothom Prem – Telefilm: Monsuba Junction (2012)
 Keno Hathat Tumi Ele – Telefilm: Nilpari Neelanjana (2013)
 Asmani – Telefilm: Nilpori Neelanjana (2013)
 Acho Hridoye – Online release (2014)
 Kono Ek Katha Bondhu – Drama: Katha Bondhu Mithila (2014)
 Tabu Keno – Drama: Addiction (2014)
 Prem Tumi – Telefilm: Angry Birds (2015)
 Ato Maya – Telefilm: Couple (2015)
 Tumimoy- Drama: To Airport (2015)
 Bhalobashar Mane- Drama: Tai Tomake (2016)
 Jaccho Hariye- Drama: Prem Tumi (2016)
 Ki Hoto Bole Gele - Drama : Memories - Kolpo Torur Golpo (2019)
 Smritir Fanush - Tahsan & Sushmita Anis (2020)
 Odrissho Porojibi - Tahsan (2020)
 Protibadi Gaan - Tahsan & The Band (2020)
 Ekdin - Tahsan (2021)
 Hariye Feli Jodi - Short Film : Shunno Theke Shuru, Closeup Kache Ashar Golpo (2021)

 Dokhino Hawa (2022) - Coke Studio Bangla

Works

Films

Television

Web series

Other works
As Host

 Lux Channel I Superstar 2006
 You Go, lLook
 Bhalobashar Golpo
 Eid Anonde Shurer Chhonde
 Honeymoon
 Drops and Beats

As Judge

 Lux Channel I Superstar 2014
 Lux Channel I Superstar 2018
 Miss Universe Bangladesh 2019
• Miss Universe Bangladesh 2020
TV commercials

 Banglalink Amar Tune
 Close-Up Kache Ashar Golpo
 Ponds Facewash
 Jui Coconut Oil
 Aftab Spices
 Close-Up
 Meril Baby Products
 Marks Full Cream Milk Powder
 Chaka Super White
 Singer
 Grameenphone
 My GP App
 Fresh Premium Tea

References

External links 

 
 

Living people
Notre Dame College, Dhaka alumni
University of Dhaka alumni
Carlson School of Management alumni
21st-century Bangladeshi male singers
21st-century Bangladeshi singers
1979 births
Academic staff of the University of Liberal Arts Bangladesh
Best Male Singer Meril-Prothom Alo Award winners
Academic staff of BRAC University